Raichur District, in the state of Karnataka, India, comprises 7 administrative sub-divisions, called "Taluks".

 Raichur District 
Sirwar Taluk 
 Sindhanur Taluk

 Manvi Taluk
 Devadurga  Taluk
Maski Taluk
 Lingasugur Taluk

Taluks of Karnataka
Geography of Raichur district